Matteo Waem (born 21 June 2000) is a Belgian professional footballer who plays as a centre-back for Eerste Divisie club MVV Maastricht.

Career

Early years
Waem grew up in Merksem, a suburb of Antwerp, and took his first steps in football at the age of five at Seja, a regional football club. At the age of six he joined the Royal Antwerp academy, where he played until 2020. During this period, he also had a short stint at Westerlo for a year before resuming his career at Antwerp. During the 2019–20 season, he was on a trial practice at English EFL Championship club Birmingham City and succeeded in convincing them to a transfer. Due to external factors, however, the deal fell through.

MVV
In June 2020, Waem signed with Dutch Eerste Divisie club MVV. He made his professional debut on 5 September 2020 in a 7–1 home loss to Cambuur, replacing Koen Kostons in the 84th minute.

Waem was appointed team captain of MVV ahead of the 2022–23 season.

Personal life
Waem has described his younger brother Andreas as his main inspiration. His brother has autism, something Waem has mentioned as the reason for him studying psychology next to his career as a professional footballer.

Career statistics

References

External links
 

2000 births
Living people
Belgian footballers
Belgian expatriate footballers
Association football midfielders
K.V.C. Westerlo players
Royal Antwerp F.C. players
MVV Maastricht players
Eerste Divisie players
Belgian expatriate sportspeople in the Netherlands
Expatriate footballers in the Netherlands
People from Merksem
Footballers from Antwerp